A synth or synthesizer is an electronic musical instrument.

Synth may also refer to:


Science
Synthetic biology
Synthetic intelligence

Media
 Synth (video game), a freeware strategic action game that utilizes procedurally generated graphics
 Synth, machines powered by organic components used by the Combine in the Half-Life video game series
 Synth, androids featured in the video game Fallout 4
 Synth, anthropomorphic robots depicted in the television series Humans

Other uses
 Synth Look and Feel, a skinnable Java look and feel

See also
Synthetic (disambiguation)